Pensacola Comic Convention (Pensacola Comic Con; formerly known as Pensacola Para Con Comic Convention) is a convention for fans of science fiction, horror, fantasy, gaming, anime, costuming, fan films, and indie films held annually in Pensacola, Florida. The event is owned by Pensacola Comic Convention LLC. The event offers celebrity meet and greets, discussion panels, workshops, film screenings, film festivals, demonstrations, costume contests, and competitions. The event also offers investigations at local historic haunted locations such as the Pensacola Victorian Inn, The Pensacola Light House, the Pensacola Gray House, and the Pensacola Little Theater. A portion of the proceeds of the event are donated to Ronald McDonald House Charities and Making Strides with Breast Cancer and Ronald McDonald House. The convention is the first female African American owed comic convention in the USA.

History
Pensacola Comic Convention (Pensacola Comic Con) was started in the Fall of 2010 by Ericka Boussarhane, (psychic medium and paranormal investigator). She felt the Florida Panhandle and Emerald Coast community did not have anything that mixed all the con genres of science fiction, horror, fantasy, gaming, anime, costuming, indie films, artists, celebrities, comics, Renaissance, cosplay, steampunk, theater, performing, literature, publishing, arts, mystery, collecting, model construction, film making, and paranormal.

Conventions
All conventions took place in the Pensacola Interstate Fair Ground Conference Building.

2010 held September 17–18, 2010. Guest, among others, was Patrick Burns, Scott Tepperman GHI, and Brad and Barry Klinge  (paranormal investigator)Ghost Lab

2011 held October 15–16, 2011. Guest, among others, were Brian Harnois Ghost Hunters, George Noory, Brian J. Cano and Chris Mancuso Scared! Haunted Collector, Ken Gerhard American cryptozoologist, Scott Tepperman GHI, and Raymond Moody

2012 held September 22–23, 2012. Guest, among others, was Dave Lapham and Scott Tepperman GHI, The Christine Movie Car, Ari Lehman, and Skeeter The Duck.

2013 held August 17–18, 2013. Guests, among others, were RJ Haddy, Richard Epcar, Cindy Morgan, Jason Faunt, Jim O'Rear, Ari Lehman, Michael Berryman, Scott Tepperman, and Addy Miller.

2014 held August 9–10, 2014. Guests, among others, were Lou Ferrigno, Erin Cahill, Jason Faunt, Erika Eleniak, C. Thomas Howell, Jim O'Rear, Fred Williams, Robin Shelby, Gil Gerard, Scott Tepperman, Sonny Strait, Cleve Hall, Oliver Robins and Ari Lehman.

2015 held August 8–9, 2015. Guests, among others, were Randy Couture, Eric Roberts, Lori Petty, Karyn Parsons, Tatyana Ali, Jennifer Rhodes, Greg Cipes, Teddy Long, Michael Copon, Hilary Shepard, Jim O'Rear, Michael Jai White, Larry Wilcox, Rocky Johnson, Scott Tepperman, Jim Tavaré, Bobby Campo, Schoolly D, 501st Legion; BATCOPTER N3079G BATMAN, the 1966 BATMOBILE, and BATCYCLE.

2016 held August 20–21, 2016. Guests: Dennis Rodman (NBA Legend), Adrian Paul, (Highlander, War of the Worlds), Corbin Bernsen ( (L.A. Law, Psych, The Dentist, Major League), Ciara Hanna (Power Rangers Megaforce), Johnny Yong Bosch (Mighty Morphin Power Rangers, Ichigo Kurosaki in Bleach), Tim Russ Star Trek: Voyager, Fall Out 4, ICarly), Gary Schwartz (Team Fortress, Demoman, Star Trek, Batman Returns), Robert LaSardo (Death Race, CSI Miami, Nip Tuck), Larry Nemecek ("Dr. Trek" Star Trek Continues), Dave Fennoy ("Lee Everett" Walking Dead, Hulu, Prototype, The Wolf Among Us), David Della Rocco (The Boondock Saints), Erika Ervin ("Amazon Eve" American Horror Story), Eugene A. Clark ("Big Daddy" Land of the Dead), Jeremy Palko ( The Walking Dead, Vampire Diaries), Justin Kucsulain (The Walking Dead, Bloodlines), Gulf South Wrestling Reunion, Jerry Stubbs, Robert Fuller, Bullet Bob Armstrong, Chuck Wagner (Automan), Mike Mundy (Walking Dead), Knightmage (American Cosplayer), Alex Vincent (Child's Play, Curse of Chucky), Zach Galligan (Gremlins, Star Trek, Hatchet), William Katt (The Greatest American Hero), Michael Beck (Warriors, Xanadu), Jerrad Vunovich (Walking Dead, Hunger Games, American Horror Story), Shadow Clone (Geek Rock Party, Nerdcore Rap Artist), Bruce Carr (No Ordinary Balloon Artist), Gulf South Wrestling, E & E Wrestling, Mystery Machine Van from Scooby-Doo, Jurassic Park Tour Vehicle, Cosplay Inc, and Tennessee Wraith Chasers Ghost Asylum, and more.

2017 held August 17–18, 2017. Guests: Corbin Bernsen, (L.A. Law), (Psych), (The Dentist), (Major League), Scott Steiner AKA ((Big Poppa Pump)), ((The Big Bad Booty Daddy)), ((Freakzilla)), Genetic Freak- Pro Wrestler, Broward Batman Batmobile and 4Kids in Need, Hector David Jr. ((Power Rangers Samurai)), ((Percy Jackson & the Olympians: The Lightning Thief)), Rick Cosnett ((The Flash)), ((Vampire Diaries)), ((Quantico)), Eddie Deezen ((Grease)), ((Grease 2)), ((Midnight Madness)), ((1941)), and ((WarGames)), Martin Klebba ((Pirates of the Caribbean)),  ((CSI)), ((Scrubs)), ((Bones)), and ((Charmed)), Ghost Brothers Dalen Spratt, Juwan Mass, and Marcus Harvey, Ann Marie Crouch ((Princess Shayla)), ((Power Rangers)), John Mangus ((Jurassic World)), ((Fantastic Four)), ((Hot Tub Time Machine 2)), True Detective, Escape Plan, Dawn of the Planet , Scott Tepperman Syfy Channel's ((Ghost Hunters International)), Nightblade, Night of the Living Dead: Genesis, Jim O' Rear ((Don't Look in the Basement 2)), The Hospital, The Hospital 2, Camp Massacre, Hybrid, and I Dared You! Truth or Dare 5 Nicholas Roylance, Ridiculous Films, Bruce Carr aka No Ordinary Balloon Man, Gene Hamil Twisted Carnival Studios, Joey Oropeza Pecach Pictures and more.

2018 Hosted at Pensacola Victorian Inn, Imogene Theatre, Pensacola Lighthouse.

2019 Hosted at Pensacola Victorian Inn, Seville Quarter, Imogene Theatre, Pensacola Lighthouse, Dreamland Skating Rink, DAR House, Historic Blakeley State Park, Fort Pickens, Fort Blakeley

2020 Hosted  at Pensacola Victorian Inn, The Malaga Inn, and Historic Blakeley State Park

2021 Hosted  at Pensacola Victorian Inn, Fort Morgan Historic Site, 

2022 Host  Location Fort Morgan Historic Site

2023 Host  Location Pensacola Fair Grounds

Sources
 Ross, Rebecca. "Chip off the old block" "Pensacola News Journal", Retrieved on Mar. 13, 2009.
 Moon, Troy "Take a walk on the weird side Spice up your summer UFO tours and ghost walks""Pensacola News Journal" Retrieved on Jul. 10, 2009
 McKeon, Jennie  "Ghost Hunting in Downtown Pensacola" "Inweekly Newspaper" Retrieved on September 15, 2010
 Ross, Rebecca   " Nothing 'normal' at this gathering"  "Pensacola News Journal" Retrieved Sept 20, 2010.
 Staff Writer " Pensacola: Is Pensacola Haunted?"  "Trip Advisor" Retrieved 2010
 Moon, Troy Troy Moon " All things paranormal coming town"  "Pensacola News Journal"  Retrieved Oct. 11, 2011
 Staff Writer "Pensacola Para Con 2011Ghost Hunting, Sci-Fi Convention " "Fox 10 News" Retrieved Oct 11 2011.
 Geek Admin  "Florida Geek Scene", Retrieved June 15, 2012
 Staff Writer " Fun at Paracon event anything but normal" "Splash" Magazine" Retrieved Sept 1 2012
 Staff Writer "Pensacola Paracon Sept. 22-23 at Pensacola Fairgrounds " "Mullet Wrapper Newspaper" Retrieved September 18, 2012
 Staff writer " Ghosts paranormal activity at 2012 Pensacola Para Con" "WEAR TV 3 News"  Retrieved September 23, 2012
 Cooper, Josh   "Pensacola Paracon offers a walk on the weird side" "Pensacola News Journal" Retrieved Sep. 24, 2012
 Medina,  Kristina "Pensacola Paracon beckons those seeking paranormal experience" "The Voyager" Retrieved April 13, 2013
 Barnwell, Alison " Spring Hill man builds 'Lone Ranger' diorama with Legos"  "Tampa Bay Times Newspaper" Retrieved July 3, 2013
 Staff writer "DANCE, DANCE PARA-CON Fans of zombies, the paranormal, and horror films have reason to rejoice:" "Inweekly Newspaper", Retrieved July 3, 2013
 Robinson, Kevin "Para-Con is sci-fi paradise" "Pensacola News Journal" Retrieved Aug 18, 2013
 Pillion, Dennis  "Pensacola Para Con bringing 'geek paradise' to the Panhandle this weekend" "Al.com Newspaper" Retrieved August 14, 2013
 Diaz, Julio "Scare up some fun at Pensacola Para-Con"  "Pensacola News Journal" Retrieved Aug 16, 2013
 Pillion, Dennis " Newspaper Zombies, comic characters, costume buffs turn out in droves at Pensacola Para Con "  "Al.com Newspaper" Retrieved August 17, 2013
 Pillion, Dennis  "This weekend at the beach: Blues music, Friday night lights and more cosplay" "Al.com Newspaper" Retrieved August 23, 2013
 BGG Staff  "Meet Your Favorite Film & TV Stars At Pensacola Para Con " "BGG After Dark", Retrieved March 2014
 Moon, troy  "Paranormal, sci-fi convention returns "  "Pensacola News Journal" Retrieved July 1, 2014
 Staff Writer "It's not Pensacon, It's Para Con"   "Pensacola News Journal" Retrieved July 2, 2014
 Staff writer "Incredible Hulk in Pensacola"  "Destin Log Newspaper"  Retrieved July 11, 2014
 Easton, Ed cultured/12698469/  "Barnes & Noble in Pensacola kicks off its Get Pop-Cultured series Friday. " "Pensacola News Journal" Retrieved July 15, 2014
 Staff Writer " The Incredible Hulk will be at Pensacola" "Mullet Wrapper Newspaper" Retrieved July 23, 2014
 Staff Writer "Explore Pensacola Para Con" "Splash! Magazine" Retrieved Aug 1 2014
 Staff Writer "PENSACOLA PARA CON"  "Inweekly Newspaper" Retrieved August 6, 2014
 Staff writer  "Arc Gateway presents at Pensacola Paracon " "WEAR TV 3 News" Retrieved Aug 6 2014
 Pillion, Dennis Pensacola
Moon, Troy   " Lou Ferrigno, C. Thomas Howell at Para Con" Pensacola News Journal Retrieved Aug 8 2014
Staff writer "Pensacola Paracon kicks off" "WEAR TV 3 News" Retrieved Aug 9 2014
Emer, Joe  " Pensacola Paracon kicks off this weekend and promises to be a blast" Fox 10 NewsRetrieved Aug 2014
Hoeger, Rebekah "Para Con in Pensacola hosts 143 vendors" Fox 10 News Retrieved Aug 2014
Moon, Troy "Hulk and heat"  "Pensacola News Journal" Retrieved Aug 10, 2014
 Little, Aaron "Paracon Mania" Santa Rosa Press Gazette" Retrieved August 14, 2014

 Staff Writer "Pensacola Para Con" "Inweekly Newspaper" Retrieved August 17, 2014 .
 Terefenko, Veronica "Pensacola Comic Con coming in August"  "Pensacola News Journal" Retrieved July 12, 2016 
 Girod, Brandon "First-timers Guide: Pensacola Comic Con"  "Pensacola News Journal" Retrieved Aug. 18, 2016 
 Girod, Brandon "Geek out this weekend at Pensacola Comic Con"  "Pensacola News Journal" Retrieved Aug. 17, 2016 
Pensacola Comic Convention Trademark 
Pensacola Comic Con Trademark 
Pensacola Comic-Con Trademark

References

External links
 

Entertainment companies of the United States
Paranormal organizations
multigenre conventions
science fiction conventions in the United States
gaming conventions
comics conventions
Recurring events established in 2010
2010 establishments in Florida
Annual events in Florida
Festivals in Florida
Tourist attractions in Escambia County, Florida
Conventions in Florida